The Milton line is one of the seven train lines of the GO Transit system in the Greater Toronto Area, Ontario, Canada. It extends from Union Station in Toronto to Milton, by way of Mississauga.

History
The Canadian Pacific Railway strongly resisted all efforts to put passenger trains on company-owned tracks to avoid disturbance of freight activity into Toronto. Due to the 1979 Mississauga train derailment and efforts made by Mississauga Mayor Hazel McCallion, there was increased pushback for a passenger train line. McCallion and Mississauga city council threatened to sue CP for the cost of the emergency services and mass evacuation caused by the derailment on the CPR line near Mavis Rd. As part of the compromise that got the suit dropped, CP agreed to drop its long-standing objection to passenger service on its freight line.

Following a promotional opening on Sunday October 25, 1981, regular service began the following Monday.  Six trips were operated from 2002–2009 and five before this. From 2009–2011, there were seven inbound and seven outbound train trips daily. An eighth train was added to the morning and afternoon runs in 2011 and a ninth train started on January 5, 2015. On February 25, 2016, a tenth train was announced for the 2016–17 fiscal year, as part of the 2016 Ontario budget process.

The Ontario government is working with Metrolinx to have more train service along the Milton line, known as the GO Transit Regional Express Rail, over the next decade.  During peak hours, trains would run in peak direction every 15 minutes along this line.

Waterloo Region
Bus service was expanded into the cities of Cambridge, Kitchener and Waterloo in October 2009. Several bus routes operate between the University of Waterloo and Wilfrid Laurier University in Waterloo, the Charles Street Transit Terminal in Kitchener, and the Cambridge SmartCentre shopping centre to the Square One Bus Terminal in central Mississauga, including a small number of trips connecting with the train service at Milton GO Station.

The Regional Municipality of Waterloo funded a study indicating that a $110 million extension of the Milton line could bring trains to Cambridge by 2012, with possible stations at Guelph Line in Campbellville, Highway 6 in Puslinch, and at Franklin Boulevard (a park and ride) and Water Street (downtown with transit connections) in Cambridge. However, the plans didn't come to fruition when an environmental assessment became a victim of budget cuts. GO Transit expects expansion of train service to Cambridge to happen in the 15 to 25 year time frame, after passenger capacity upgrades at Milton to relieve current train overcrowding.

In September 2016, GO Transit created a new bus service to connect Cambridge and Milton on weekday mornings during peak travel times, with six return trips in the evening. This bus route averaged only five passengers per trip and was cancelled in June 2019 due to low demand.

Town of Milton
Regional Express Rail (RER) is part of the Province’s ‘Big Move’, a $50-billion public transit expansion adopted in 2008 to reduce traffic congestion in the GTHA. Part of the original plan announced in 2008 was the implementation of two-way, all-day rail service to Milton, slated to be in place within 15 years of the announcement (2023). In the 2012 ‘Big Move Update’, this timeline shifted to a 16-to-25-year planning horizon. As a result of this deferral to a longer-term timeline for the improvements, Milton town councillor Rick DiLorenzo has referred to the Milton line as the "orphan" of Metrolinx. Regional Chair Gary Carr said it feels like the rug was being pulled from underneath them with these sudden changes that affected Halton towns such as Milton and Georgetown. "If the Big Move projects benefiting Halton are delayed, Halton will not be able to meet provincial growth plan targets. The transportation system mode split and level of service objectives will not be met," said Tim Dennis, Halton's regional transportation services director.

Making matters worse for Town of Milton residents, the 2012 Big Move update document indicates that RER all-day, two-way service will only extend as far west as Meadowvale station in Mississauga, and will not service Lisgar station in Mississauga, nor Milton's station, service which had been promised by the provincial Liberals Halton candidate during the 2011 election. This change was approved in February 2013.

The discrepancy appears to come between conflicting stated goals between the Big Move (full two-way, all-day service to Milton within 15 years) and GO 2020 (two-way, all-day service only to Meadowvale station in 15 years, and to Milton and Lisgar within 25 years). An objective of The Big Move Update is to align the GO 2020 plan and The Big Move. Reports cited "significant infrastructure and operational challenges that mean it will not be possible to deliver two-way, all-day service all the way to Milton in the 15-year time horizon. Additional tracks and potentially numerous grade separations are necessary are a prerequisite to the expansion of service to Milton. The construction is especially challenging through built-up areas. This rail corridor is largely owned by CPR, a private third party operating freight rail. Their approval is required for any service and infrastructure expansion. Two-way, all-day service can be delivered to Meadowvale in the 15-year timeframe, but the full extension to Milton can only be delivered over the 25-year horizon."

The new proposal in the 2020 strategic plan includes these new revised service levels, with buses extending service westward:
Peak Service: 15-minute or better train service for Meadowvale, with express service during high-demand periods. Counter-peak service every 30 minutes.
Off-Peak Service: All-day service twice hourly to Meadowvale with bus service to Milton.

2015 developments
In April 2015, Metrolinx in partnership with the Town of Milton launched a pilot project through an app called Rideco which allows GO riders to book transportation to and from the Milton GO Station. This is due to the Milton station's parking lot being full by the time the second morning train arrives. As North America's fastest growing community for the last decade, the parking lot has increasing been in demand by new residents and those driving in from Cambridge.

2017 developments
In 2017, at a Region of Halton planning and public works committee meeting Halton Region director of planning and chief planning official Ron Glenn said, "The timing for the Milton two-way, all-day GO is in the post 25-year horizon. Interestingly enough, we had a discussion with Metrolinx this week about creating a focus group on getting a defined time for the two-way, all-day GO service in Milton as a priority." The information was shared with regional councillors at a February 8 planning and public works committee. On February 17, Metrolinx, through Halton MPP Indira Naidoo-Harris, challenged that assertion, saying, "Metrolinx is not aware of any sources that would lead to the information that was posted in the Milton Canadian Champion article. We are still working toward better service on the Milton GO line."

Station list

Future
In 2015, Metrolinx released a list of potential sites for construction of new GO train stations. For the Milton line, the sites include:
Bathurst/Spadina, between Bathurst Street and Spadina Avenue in Toronto
Liberty Village, near King Street West
Queen West, at the intersection of Queen Street West and Dufferin Street
Dundas West, near the intersection of Dundas Street West and College Street
The East Mall
The West Mall
Cawthra/Dundas, near the intersection of Cawthra Road and Dundas Street West
Trafalgar, southeast of Highway 401 at Trafalgar Road

Selection of some station sites would preclude other sites. Only one of The East Mall and The West Mall sites would result in a potential future station, as would only one of the Liberty Village, Queen Street West-Dufferin, and Dundas West sites. The potential site for The East Mall or The West Mall is south of Dundas Street West near its intersection with Highway 427. After a business case, none of these stations were determined to have a positive economic impact and thus were removed from the Regional Express Rail plan.

On August 10, 2021, the federal government indicated a willingness to partially fund an upgrade to the Milton line to handle all-day, two-way train service, but gave no timeline or a specific funding amount. Such an upgrade would cost about $1 billion. Before 2020, the line carried 30,000 passengers per day; however, freight traffic was a constraint against expansion of commuter service.

See also
 Canadian Pacific Railway

References

External links
 GO Transit: Milton train and bus service schedule (PDF)

GO Transit
Passenger rail transport in Toronto
Passenger rail transport in Mississauga
Passenger rail transport in the Regional Municipality of Halton
Passenger rail transport in Peel Region
Rail transport in Milton, Ontario
Railway lines opened in 1981
1981 establishments in Ontario